

Presidential election

The Election Commission of India held the second presidential elections of India on May 6, 1957. Dr. Rajendra Prasad won his re-election with 459,698 votes over his nearest rival Chowdhry Hari Ram.

General election

General elections to the second Lok Sabha since independence were held in India between 24 February to 14 March 1957. The Indian National Congress (INC) easily won the second term, winning 371 of the 494 seats and their vote share increased from 45.0% to 47.8%.

Legislative Assembly elections
Legislative Assembly elections in India were conducted for Andhra Pradesh, Assam, Bihar, Bombay, Karnataka,  Kerala, Madhya Pradesh, Madras, Odisha, Punjab, Rajasthan, Uttar Pradesh and West Bengal legislative assemblies in 1957.

Andhra Pradesh*

* : On 1 November 1956, Andhra State was merged with Hyderabad State under States Reorganisation Act, 1956, to form a single state, Andhra Pradesh. The  districts of Raichur, Gulbarga and the Marathwada district were detached from the Hyderabad State, while merging with Andhra State. In addition, the Siruguppa taluk, the Bellary taluk, the Hospet taluk and a small area of the Mallapuram sub-taluk were transferred from Mysore State to Andhra Pradesh.

Assam

Bihar*

* : Bihar was reduced slightly by the transfer of minor territories to West Bengal in 1956 under States Reorganisation Act, 1956.

Bombay*

*: On 1 November 1956, under States Reorganisation Act, 1956, Bombay state was re-organized by the addition of Saurashtra State and Kutch State, Nagpur Division of Madhya Pradesh, and Marathwada region of Hyderabad. The state's southernmost districts of Bombay were transferred to Mysore State while Abu Road taluk of the Banaskantha district was transferred to Rajasthan.

Kerala*

* : In 1956, under States Reorganisation Act, 1956, Kerala was formed by the merger of Travancore-Cochin state with the Malabar district of Madras State, Kasaragod taluk of the South Canara district and the Amindive Islands. The southern part of Travancore-Cochin, Kanyakumari district was transferred to Madras State.

Madhya Pradesh*

* : On 1 November 1956, under States Reorganisation Act, 1956, Madhya Bharat (except the Sunel enclave of the Mandsaur district), Vindhya Pradesh, Bhopal state and the Sironj sub-division of the Kota district of Rajasthan were merged into Madhya Pradesh while the Nagpur Division was transferred to Bombay State.

Madras*

* : On 1 November 1956, the southern part of Travancore-Cochin (Kanyakumari district) was added to the Madras State while the Malabar district of the state was transferred to the new state of Kerala, and a new union territory, Laccadive, Minicoy and Amindivi Islands, was created.

Mysore*

* : On 1 November 1956, Mysore state was enlarged by the addition of Coorg State, the Kollegal taluk of the Coimbatore district and the South Kanara district (except the Kasaragod taluk) of Madras State,  and the Kannada speaking districts from southern Bombay state and western Hyderabad State under States Reorganisation Act, 1956. The Siruguppa taluk, the Bellary taluk, the Hospet taluk and a small area of the Mallapuram sub-taluk were detached from the Mysore State.

Odisha

Punjab*

* : Punjab was enlarged by the addition of Patiala & East Punjab States Union in 1956 under States Reorganisation Act, 1956.

Rajasthan*

* : On 1 November 1956, under States Reorganisation Act, 1956, the Ajmer State, the Abu Road taluk of the Banaskantha district of Bombay State, the Sunel enclave of the Mandsaur district and the Lohara sub-tehsil of the Hissar district of the Punjab was merged with Rajasthan while the Sironj sub-division of the Kota district of Rajasthan was transferred to Madhya Pradesh.

Uttar Pradesh

West Bengal*

* : West Bengal was enlarged by the addition of minor territories from Bihar in 1956 under States Reorganisation Act, 1956.

See also
 1951–52 elections in India
 1954 elections in India
 1955 elections in India

References

External links

 Election Commission of India

1957 elections in India
India
1957 in India
Elections in India by year